El Houamed is a city in Algeria. It is the birthplace of Nordine Zouareg.

References

Communes of M'Sila Province
Baladiyat of Libya
M'Sila Province